Domingo González de Acosta (1628-1715) was a Spanish politician, who served as alcalde and comandante of Buenos Aires during the Habsburg period.

Biography 
He was born in Buenos Aires, the son of Antonio González de Acosta, a Portuguese merchant, and María Sanabria, daughter of Antón García Caro and María Gómez Méndez de Sotomayor. His wife was Francisca Marquina, daughter of Francisco de Uzueña and Isabel Marquina, belonging to a family from Santiago del Estero.

Domingo González de Acosta was elected Mayor of first vote of the city of Buenos Aires in 1689. He also served as Mayordomo of Buenos Aires in 1660, and was appointed as Alférez Real, in charge of carrying the Royal standard during the festival of Saint Martin of Tours.

References 

1628 births
1715 deaths
Argentine people of Portuguese descent
Argentine people of Spanish descent
Spanish colonial governors and administrators
Mayors of Buenos Aires
People from Buenos Aires
Spanish army officers